Diane Forsythe is a Northern Irish politician who is a Democratic Unionist Party Member of the Legislative Assembly (MLA). She was elected as an MLA in the 2022 Northern Ireland Assembly election for South Down.

She is the first female unionist to represent the area.

Political career 
She unsuccessfully stood for election in the South Down Westminster constituency at the 2017 UK general election. She came in third place polling 8,867 votes, equating to 17.4% of the total vote.

In April 2022, shortly before the 2022 Assembly election, all of the DUP's officers in South Down refused to endorse the party's candidate Forsythe and resigned from the DUP. They claimed that Forsythe was "imposed" on them by the DUP without proper consultation.

The Police Service of Northern Ireland launched an investigation into "a defamatory message" being shared about Forsythe during the election campaign.

On 5 May 2022, Diane Forsythe was elected as the new Democratic Unionist Party MLA for the South Down Constituency. Polling 6,497 first preference votes, and successful being elected on the 6th count with 11,073 votes.

References 

Living people
Northern Ireland MLAs 2022–2027
Democratic Unionist Party MLAs
Female members of the Northern Ireland Assembly
21st-century women politicians from Northern Ireland
Democratic Unionist Party parliamentary candidates
Year of birth missing (living people)